Kowloon City Plaza (KCP) is a shopping centre located at Kowloon City, Kowloon, Hong Kong. It was established in 1993, and it underwent a HK$100-million renovation from October 2005 to December 2006. The shopping centre re-opened on 26 January 2007.

History
On 28 November 1989, the site was purchased at government auction for HK$286 million by Lo Yuk-sui of development company Century City. Lo stated that his company planned to spend HK$700 million constructing a shopping and cinema complex, with a car park, on the site.

A subsidiary of Century City, Cathay City International, launched the Kowloon City Plaza development. The property was sold to Paliburg Holdings, a related company, in December 1990 for HK$357 million.

The complex received its occupation permit in May 1993. It opened later that year. Following the closure of nearby Kai Tak Airport, Paliburg Holdings proposed to build a 39-storey hotel on part of the site. However, this was rejected by the Town Planning Board on 19 November 1999, on the grounds that the scale of the proposal was not compatible with the site's surroundings.

Kowloon City Plaza was acquired by real estate fund Pamfleet, in partnership with Morgan Stanley, for HK$2.03 billion in April 2004. Pioneer Global Group, a technology company, subsequently took a small stake in the deal. The new owners thereafter carried out a major renovation, completed in 2006 at a cost of around HK$100 million, of the interior and exterior of the property. Rents doubled following the refurbishment.

During the 2008 financial crisis, the property was sold to toy baron Francis Choi for HK$1.48 billion.

Location 

Kowloon City Plaza is located near the Kowloon Walled City Park and Carpenter Road Park.

Description
It also had 400 parking spaces. The anchor tenant is Japanese supermarket and department store AEON, which occupies the entirety of the 2/F and 3/F levels.

Gallery

See also 

 Shopping in Hong Kong

References

External links 
 

Shopping malls established in 1993
Shopping centres in Hong Kong
Kowloon City
1993 establishments in Hong Kong